Geoffrey Scarre is a moral philosopher and professor of philosophy at the University of Durham.

His research focuses on a cluster of topics in applied ethics and moral philosophy broadly construed, including evil, the Holocaust, death, forgiveness, courage, the ethics of archaeology, and utilitarianism, with a special interest in the philosophy of John Stuart Mill.

He is the director of the Centre for the Ethics of Cultural Heritage.

Published works
Utilitarianism (London: Routledge, 1996)
After Evil: Responding to Wrongdoing (Aldershot: Ashgate, 2004)
Mill's On Liberty: A Reader's Guide (New York: Continuum, 2007)
Death (Stocksfield: Acumen, 2007)
On Courage (London: Routledge, 2010)

Edited books
Moral Philosophy and the Holocaust, with Eve Garrard (Aldershot: Ashgate, 2003)
The Ethics of Archaeology: Philosophical Perspectives on Archaeological Practice, with Chris Scarre (Cambridge: Cambridge University Press, 2006)

Journal papers
"Should we fear death?", European Journal of Philosophy, 5 (1997)
"Understanding the moral phenomenology of the Third Reich", Ethical Theory and Moral Practice, 1 (1998)
"Interpreting the categorical imperative", British Journal for the History of Philosophy, 6 (1998)
"On caring about one's posthumous reputation", American Philosophical Quarterly, 38 (2001)
"Corporal punishment", Ethical Theory and Moral Practice, 6 (2003)
"Archaeology and respect for the dead", Journal of Applied Philosophy, 20 (2003)
"Excusing the inexcusable? Moral responsibility and ideologically-motivated wrongdoing", Journal of Social Philosophy, 36 (2005)
"Corrective justice and reputation", Journal of Moral Philosophy, 3 (2006)

External links
Durham University staff profile
Personal homepage

Academics of Durham University
Year of birth missing (living people)
Living people